Melancholy is a live album by Cecil Taylor's Workshop Ensemble featuring Evan Parker, Barry Guy and Tony Oxley recorded on September 30, 1990 at the Bechstein Concert Hall in Berlin and released on the FMP label.

Reception

The Allmusic review by Steven Loewy states "Taylor is unquestionably more effective as an arranger in the small group (and solo) contexts to which he is accustomed. With the ensemble, there is a sense that ideas are not always fully realized, although, to be sure, there are remarkable moments throughout. Whether charges of incomplete or confusing rehearsals are accurate is immaterial. What matters is that the results, while good, probably could have been better. Regardless, Taylor aficionados will want to own this one because of the players in the band and because of the extraordinary moments".

The authors of the Penguin Guide to Jazz Recordings wrote: "it is... enough to have other composers and arrangers slack-jawed, with three pieces that put an evolving structure through complex changes and developments. If the middle section, 'Sphere No. 2', seems like a bonding of improvisors, then 'Sphere No. 3' expands to a glorious reconciliation of free solos and composed and implicit structures."

Track listing 
All compositions by Cecil Taylor.
 "Sphere No. 1" - 20:33 
 "Sphere No. 2" - 20:36 
 "Sphere No. 3" - 28:59 
 Recorded at the Bechstein Concert Hall, Berlin on September 30, 1990

Personnel 
 Cecil Taylor: piano
 Tobias Netta: trumpet
 Wolfgang Fuchs: sopranino saxophone, bass clarinet
 Harri Sjöström: soprano saxophone
 Volker Schlott: alto saxophone
 Evan Parker: tenor saxophone, soprano saxophone
 Thomas Klemm: tenor saxophone
 Jörg Huke: Thomas Wiedermann: trombone
 Barry Guy: double bass
 Tony Oxley: drums

References 

1999 live albums
Cecil Taylor live albums
FMP Records live albums